The 2004 Evolution Championship Series (commonly referred to as Evo 2004 or EVO 2004) was a fighting game event held at the California State Polytechnic University, Pomona in Pomona, California from July 29 to August 1. The event featured nine fighting games on the main lineup, including Street Fighter III: 3rd Strike and Marvel vs. Capcom 2. While in previous Evolution events all competitions were held on arcade machines, most tournaments at Evo 2004 were played on video game consoles.

Evo 2004 featured the first Street Fighter match between Daigo Umehara and Justin Wong, in which Umehara executed the "Daigo Parry". The controversial final match of the Soulcalibur II tournaments held at Evo 2004 motivated the implementation of a collusion rule still in use today.

Background

The sixth Evolution Championship Series was held at the California State Polytechnic University, Pomona, Southern California on July 29 to August 1. Evo 2004 featured approximately 700 participants from over 30 nations, each competing in one or more of the nine tournaments held at the event. In order to create an easier situation for staff and increase the average play time of participants, the double-elimination-style tournaments of previous Evo events was replaced with a round-robin/double-elimination pool system. In the old system, some players would find themselves being eliminated from a tournament after losing two games, but because of the newly implemented system each participant would face off against at least nine other players during the preliminary pool.

Up until Evo 2004, every Evolution event relied almost entirely on arcade cabinets. However, arcade hardware has always been relatively difficult to get a hold of, especially for games that do not run on Capcom's CP System II system boards. Furthermore, arcade hardware would commonly offer up technical issues. Lastly, competitors often complained that the arcade hardware available at Evolution was different from the hardware they have trained on. In order to solve these issues, the Evolution organizers opted to switch to using video game consoles only at the tournament, where participants have to bring their own game controllers. Only the Street Fighter III: Third Strike tournament held at Evo 2004 was played on arcade hardware, because the Street Fighter Anniversary Collection release date was pushed back to August.

Tournament organizers opted to turn the team tournaments, which were traditionally exhibition matches, into a main part of the event. Two specifically seeded team tournaments in Capcom vs. SNK 2 and Marvel vs. Capcom 2 and a Pair Play tournament for Tekken Tag Tournament were held at Evo 2004. Evo 2004 also featured a "Bring Your Own Console" area, where people were able to set up smaller-scale tournaments of games not on the main roster.

Evo Moment #37

Despite having never matched off against each other before, the Japanese Daigo Umehara and American Justin Wong were known for having a supposed rivalry with each other due to their differences in gaming philosophies. The two players met each other in the loser's finals of Evo 2004's Street Fighter III: 3rd Strike tournament. Umehara, playing using the character Ken, was down to his last pixel of vitality and any special attack by Wong's Chun-Li could knock Ken out. Wong attempted to hit his opponent with Chun-Li's multihit "Super Art" move, forcing Umehara to parry 15 attacks in a very short period of time. Umehara did so successfully and went on to counter a final kick of Chun-Li in mid-air before launching a combo move himself and winning the match. Though Umehara lost the grand finals to Kenji Obata, the clip of him parrying Wong's multihit attack became hugely influential and has been compared to famous sports moments such as Babe Ruth's called shot and the Miracle on Ice.

Soulcalibur II incident
The final match of the Soulcalibur II tournament at Evo 2004 was held between the friends Rob "RTD" Combs and Marquette "Mick" Yarbrough. The two were widely accused for collusion and not taking the fight seriously, playing using different characters than usual and playing on a "sub-par level". The two disputed these claims when asked about it on Game Show Network's Games Across America. Though Combs and Yarbrough were not punished directly, Evo went on to implement a "collusion rule", stating that players who purposely manipulate a match or intentionally underperform would forfeit prize and title. Speaking with GiantBomb in 2013, Evo-founder Tom Cannon stated that "they broke the spirit of the tournament. ... We were like 'fine, this happened, let's make sure this is never gonna happen again.'" Evolution's anti-collusion measure was further expanded in 2013 and is still in place.

Results

References

Evolution Championship Series
2004 in esports
2004 in sports in California
California State Polytechnic University, Pomona